Robin Kundis Craig is a professor at the University of Utah's  Law School. She had been the Attorneys’ Title Insurance Fund Professory at Florida State University College of Law from 2005 to 2012.  She is a leading environmental law scholar who has written important works on water and ocean and coastal issues.  She earned her Juris Doctor degree from Lewis & Clark Law School in Portland, Oregon. Professor Craig is the author of The Clean Water Act and the Constitution (Environmental Law Institute 2004), Environmental Law in Context (West 2005) and dozens of law review articles shorter works.  Her articles address, among other issues, federalism in the regulation of water in the U.S. and sustainability in ocean law and policy.  She served as a member the U.S. National Research Council's committee to assess the effects of the Clean Water Act’s regulation of the Mississippi River.  Professor Craig also served as a tenured professor at the Indiana University Robert H. McKinney School of Law.

External links
 University of Utah Faculty Profile
 Robin Kundis Craig's CV

References

American legal scholars
Living people
University of Utah faculty
Year of birth missing (living people)